Saxony State Police (German: Polizei Sachsen) is a state law-enforcement agency in Saxony, Germany. It is subordinate to the Saxony State Interior Ministry. The Chief of State Police (Landespolizeipräsident) is Horst Kretzschmar and the political head is the Minister for the Interior in Saxony Roland Wöller (CDU).

Organization 
The head office is the Chief of State Police, Horst Kretschmar, in Dresden.

The University of the Saxon Police Force (Hochschule der Sächsischen Polizei) is the central institution for the education of police officers of State Police, located in Rothenburg and Bautzen.

The office of the Anti-Riot Police Saxony (Bereitschaftspolizei Sachsen) is located in Leipzig. The President of Saxony Anti-Riot Police is Dirk Lichtenberger.

Equipment
In 2018, the organization adopted the Heckler & Koch VP9 semi-automatic pistol as the standard side-arm. The Riot Police Saxony operates an small air force department with three EC135 police helicopters.

History 
 
In 1936, all local police forces in the German Reich were reorganized by the Nazis and headed by Reichsführer SS and Chief of Police Heinrich Himmler. All state police offices in Saxony became part of Geheimen Staatspolizei in Berlin. After WWII, Saxony was part of the Soviet Military Administration in Germany and all local police offices (Volkspolizeiämter) became part of what later became Volkspolizei of GDR. The Soviet officers preferred antifacists to become police officers.

In 1990, the Saxony State Police was recruited from former Volkspolizei officers.

References

State law enforcement agencies of Germany
Organisations based in Dresden